Yazan Mousa Mahmoud Abu Al-Arab (born 31 January 1996) is a Jordanian footballer who plays as a center back for Malaysia Super League club Selangor and the Jordan national football team.

Club career

Selangor F.C. 

On 18 December 2021, Yazan officially signed up with Malaysia Super League club, Selangor alongside national teammate Baha' Abdel-Rahman for 2022 season.

International career

International career statistics

International goals 
Scores and results list Jordan's goal tally first.

Senior

References

External links 
 
 

1995 births
Living people
Sportspeople from Amman
Jordanian footballers
Association football defenders
Jordan international footballers
Jordan youth international footballers
Jordanian Pro League players
Al-Jazeera (Jordan) players
Al-Wehdat SC players
Malaysia Super League players
Selangor FA players
Jordanian expatriate footballers
Jordanian expatriate sportspeople in Malaysia
Expatriate footballers in Malaysia
2019 AFC Asian Cup players